Sunhe Station is a station on Line 15 of the Beijing Subway.

Station layout
The station has an elevated island platform.

Exits
There are 2 exits, lettered A and D. Both are accessible.

Gallery

References

External links

Beijing Subway stations in Chaoyang District